Víctor Báez Mosqueira (born 29 May 1956) is a Paraguyan trade union leader.

Born in Asuncion, Báez was a founding member of the Trade Union of Bank Employees in the 1970s, serving as its general secretary from 1977 until 1986.

In 1983, Báez was elected as the auditor of the ICFTU Inter American Regional Organisation of Workers (ORIT), and in 1985 he additionally became general secretary of the Paraguayan Inter-Union Movement (MIT).  With democratisation in Paraguay, the MIT became the Central Unitaria de Trabajadores, and Báez served as its president from 1989 until 1993.  He was also a founding member of the Southern Cone Trade Union Coordinating Body.

Báez was elected in the 1991 Paraguayan Constitutional Assembly election.  Within ORIT, he rose to become Secretary of Economic and Social Policies, and then general secretary.  In 2008 ORIT merged into the Trade Union Confederation of the Americas, and Báez continued as general secretary.  In 2018, he moved to become a Deputy General Secretary of the International Trade Union Confederation.

References

1956 births
Living people
Paraguayan trade unionists
People from Asunción